Zaljubiška ( 'In love') is the tenth studio album by Yugoslavian pop-folk singer Lepa Brena and her band Slatki Greh. It was released 27 November 1991 through the record label PGP-RTB.

This was her eleventh of twelve albums with Slatki Greh. Their final project as a group was Pomračenje sunca (2000).

This album was sold in a circulation of 350,000 copies.

Track listing

Personnel

Crew
I. Ćulum – design
D. Savić – photography

References

1991 albums
Lepa Brena albums
PGP-RTB albums